"Canto a Baja California" is the official anthem of the Mexican States of Baja California and Baja California Sur (BCS)(South Baja California). During the term of Braulio Maldonado Sández as governor, with the aim of increasing the cultural heritage of Bajacalifornianos, the writers and musicians residing in the State and the State natives who were living in other States and abroad convened on February 24, 1956 to compose the Anthem of Baja California, as well as the lyrics.

The winners of this contest were the lyrics of Rafael Trujillo, (nicknamed "Caballero Aguila") and the music of Rafael Gama, (nicknamed "Escala"). Both residents of Los Angeles, California, United States. Governor Braulio Maldonado Sández published and officially adopted the song as anthem on September 27, 1956, the Canto a Baja California (Song to Baja California).

In the state of Baja California, despite it being official, it contradicts a law which says that the state's symbols are the national symbols, with the state also having its own coat of arms.

Lyrics 
[See  talk page.]

"Canto a Baja California":

See also 
 Baja California
 Baja California peninsula

References

External links 

Canto a Baja California in the Government of the State Website

Baja California
1956 songs